Michael Poore is an American novelist, the author of three novels:  Up Jumps the Devil (2012), Reincarnation Blues (2017) andTwo Girls, a Clock, and a Crooked House (2019).

References

Year of birth missing (living people)
Living people
Place of birth missing (living people)
21st-century American novelists